The Westin Excelsior, Rome, is a luxury hotel on the Via Veneto in Rome, Italy. It opened in 1906.

History
The Hotel Excelsior opened on January 17, 1906. It was constructed by the Actiengesellschaft für Hotelunternehmungen, based in Lucerne, Switzerland. They sold the hotel in 1920 to CIGA, the Compagnia Italiana Grandi Alberghi, or Italian Grand Hotels Company, an Italian luxury chain. In 1944, the hotel became the temporary headquarters of General Mark Clark after the US Army entered Rome.

The Aga Khan IV bought CIGA in 1985, then sold it to Sheraton Hotels in 1994, which placed the Excelsior in its Luxury Collection. His senior hospitality advisor, Paul Ruffino advised the Aga Khan to maintain ownership of the Meurice in Paris and The Excelsior. Following the financial turmoil he was experiencing in hospitality Khan's decision was to only hold on to the Meurice. In 1998 Sheraton was sold to Starwood, and the Excelsior was transferred to its Westin Hotels & Resorts division and renamed The Westin Excelsior, Rome. The hotel was fully renovated in 2000. Starwood sold the hotel to Qatar-based Katara Hospitality in 2015 for €222 Million.

In popular culture
The hotel hosted the cast and crew of Ben-Hur in 1959. La Dolce Vita was filmed around the hotel in 1960 and Two Weeks in Another Town was filmed in the hotel in 1962. Portions of the 1983 miniseries The Winds of War were filmed in the hotel, as was a scene in the 2009 period musical Nine. In the 1973 film The Exorcist, Chris MacNeil (played by Ellen Burstyn) can be heard asking to be connected to the Hotel Excelsior in Rome when she is trying to reach Regan's (played by Linda Blair) father.

On March 3, 1994, singer Kurt Cobain overdosed in one of the hotel suites.

The hotel is marked by its distinctive cupola, and for the two-story "Villa la Cupola" suite located on the fifth and sixth stories beneath it. This suite is noted as one of the most expensive hotel rooms in the world, and includes hand-painted frescoes, up to seven bedrooms, and a private cinema.

References

External links
Official website

Italian companies established in 1906
Hotel buildings completed in 1906
Hotels established in 1906
Hotels in Rome
Westin hotels